The Große Aa is a , right, eastern tributary of the River Ems in western Lower Saxony (Germany).

It begins in the Samtgemeinde Freren, near the quarter of Overwater, at the confluence of the Deeper Aa and Ahe rivers. From there is flows through Lünne westwards to Hesselte, where it is joined by the Speller Aa.

See also
List of rivers of Lower Saxony

References

Emsland (region)
Rivers of Lower Saxony
Rivers of Germany